The Westerville Formation is a geologic formation in Nebraska. It preserves fossils dating back to the Carboniferous period.

See also

 List of fossiliferous stratigraphic units in Nebraska
 Paleontology in Nebraska

References
 

Carboniferous Kansas
Carboniferous geology of Nebraska
Carboniferous southern paleotropical deposits